Jackson Township may refer to the following places:

Arkansas 
 Jackson Township, Boone County, Arkansas
 Jackson Township, Calhoun County, Arkansas, in Calhoun County, Arkansas, defunct
 Jackson Township, Cleveland County, Arkansas, in Cleveland County, Arkansas, defunct
 Jackson Township, Crittenden County, Arkansas
 Jackson Township, Dallas County, Arkansas
 Jackson Township, Little River County, Arkansas
 Jackson Township, Monroe County, Arkansas
 Jackson Township, Nevada County, Arkansas
 Jackson Township, Newton County, Arkansas
 Jackson Township, Pope County, Arkansas
 Jackson Township, Randolph County, Arkansas
 Jackson Township, Sharp County, Arkansas
 Jackson Township, Union County, Arkansas
 Jackson Township, White County, Arkansas

Illinois 
 Jackson Township, Effingham County, Illinois
 Jackson Township, Will County, Illinois

Indiana 
 Jackson Township, Allen County, Indiana
 Jackson Township, Bartholomew County, Indiana
 Jackson Township, Blackford County, Indiana
 Jackson Township, Boone County, Indiana
 Jackson Township, Brown County, Indiana
 Jackson Township, Carroll County, Indiana
 Jackson Township, Cass County, Indiana
 Jackson Township, Clay County, Indiana
 Jackson Township, Clinton County, Indiana
 Jackson Township, Dearborn County, Indiana
 Jackson Township, Decatur County, Indiana
 Jackson Township, DeKalb County, Indiana
 Jackson Township, Dubois County, Indiana
 Jackson Township, Elkhart County, Indiana
 Jackson Township, Fayette County, Indiana
 Jackson Township, Fountain County, Indiana
 Jackson Township, Greene County, Indiana
 Jackson Township, Hamilton County, Indiana
 Jackson Township, Hancock County, Indiana
 Jackson Township, Harrison County, Indiana
 Jackson Township, Howard County, Indiana
 Jackson Township, Huntington County, Indiana
 Jackson Township, Jackson County, Indiana
 Jackson Township, Jay County, Indiana
 Jackson Township, Kosciusko County, Indiana
 Jackson Township, Madison County, Indiana
 Jackson Township, Miami County, Indiana
 Jackson Township, Morgan County, Indiana
 Jackson Township, Newton County, Indiana
 Jackson Township, Orange County, Indiana
 Jackson Township, Owen County, Indiana
 Jackson Township, Parke County, Indiana
 Jackson Township, Porter County, Indiana
 Jackson Township, Putnam County, Indiana
 Jackson Township, Randolph County, Indiana
 Jackson Township, Ripley County, Indiana
 Jackson Township, Rush County, Indiana
 Jackson Township, Shelby County, Indiana
 Jackson Township, Spencer County, Indiana
 Jackson Township, Starke County, Indiana
 Jackson Township, Steuben County, Indiana
 Jackson Township, Sullivan County, Indiana
 Jackson Township, Tippecanoe County, Indiana
 Jackson Township, Washington County, Indiana
 Jackson Township, Wayne County, Indiana
 Jackson Township, Wells County, Indiana
 Jackson Township, White County, Indiana

Iowa 
 Jackson Township, Adair County, Iowa
 Jackson Township, Benton County, Iowa
 Jackson Township, Boone County, Iowa
 Jackson Township, Bremer County, Iowa
 Jackson Township, Butler County, Iowa
 Jackson Township, Calhoun County, Iowa
 Jackson Township, Clarke County, Iowa
 Jackson Township, Crawford County, Iowa
 Jackson Township, Des Moines County, Iowa, in Des Moines County
 Jackson Township, Greene County, Iowa
 Jackson Township, Guthrie County, Iowa
 Jackson Township, Hardin County, Iowa
 Jackson Township, Harrison County, Iowa
 Jackson Township, Henry County, Iowa
 Jackson Township, Jackson County, Iowa
 Jackson Township, Jones County, Iowa
 Jackson Township, Keokuk County, Iowa
 Jackson Township, Lee County, Iowa
 Jackson Township, Linn County, Iowa
 Jackson Township, Lucas County, Iowa
 Jackson Township, Madison County, Iowa
 Jackson Township, Monroe County, Iowa
 Jackson Township, Poweshiek County, Iowa
 Jackson Township, Sac County, Iowa
 Jackson Township, Shelby County, Iowa, in Shelby County
 Jackson Township, Taylor County, Iowa
 Jackson Township, Van Buren County, Iowa
 Jackson Township, Warren County, Iowa, in Warren County
 Jackson Township, Washington County, Iowa, in Washington County
 Jackson Township, Wayne County, Iowa
 Jackson Township, Webster County, Iowa
 Jackson Township, Winneshiek County, Iowa

Kansas 
 Jackson Township, Anderson County, Kansas
 Jackson Township, Edwards County, Kansas
 Jackson Township, Geary County, Kansas
 Jackson Township, Jewell County, Kansas
 Jackson Township, Lyon County, Kansas
 Jackson Township, McPherson County, Kansas
 Jackson Township, Osborne County, Kansas, in Osborne County, Kansas
 Jackson Township, Riley County, Kansas, in Riley County, Kansas
 Jackson Township, Sumner County, Kansas, in Sumner County, Kansas

Minnesota 
 Jackson Township, Scott County, Minnesota

Missouri 
 Jackson Township, Andrew County, Missouri
 Jackson Township, Buchanan County, Missouri
 Jackson Township, Callaway County, Missouri
 Jackson Township, Camden County, Missouri
 Jackson Township, Carter County, Missouri
 Jackson Township, Clark County, Missouri
 Jackson Township, Clinton County, Missouri
 Jackson Township, Dallas County, Missouri
 Jackson Township, Daviess County, Missouri
 Jackson Township, Douglas County, Missouri, in Douglas County, Missouri
 Jackson Township, Gentry County, Missouri
 Jackson Township, Grundy County, Missouri
 Jackson Township, Jasper County, Missouri
 Jackson Township, Johnson County, Missouri
 Jackson Township, Linn County, Missouri
 Jackson Township, Livingston County, Missouri
 Jackson Township, Macon County, Missouri, in Macon County, Missouri
 Jackson Township, Maries County, Missouri
 Jackson Township, Monroe County, Missouri
 Jackson Township, Nodaway County, Missouri
 Jackson Township, Osage County, Missouri
 Jackson Township, Ozark County, Missouri
 Jackson Township, Polk County, Missouri
 Jackson Township, Putnam County, Missouri, in Putnam County, Missouri
 Jackson Township, Randolph County, Missouri
 Jackson Township, Reynolds County, Missouri
 Jackson Township, St. Clair County, Missouri
 Jackson Township, Ste. Genevieve County, Missouri
 Jackson Township, Shannon County, Missouri
 Jackson Township, Shelby County, Missouri
 Jackson Township, Sullivan County, Missouri
 Jackson Township, Texas County, Missouri
 Jackson Township, Webster County, Missouri

New Jersey 
 Jackson Township, New Jersey

North Carolina 
 Jackson Township, Nash County, North Carolina, in Nash County, North Carolina
 Jackson Township, Northampton County, North Carolina, in Northampton County, North Carolina
 Jackson Township, Union County, North Carolina, in Union County, North Carolina

North Dakota 
 Jackson Township, Sargent County, North Dakota, in Sargent County, North Dakota

Ohio 
 Jackson Township, Allen County, Ohio
 Jackson Township, Ashland County, Ohio
 Jackson Township, Auglaize County, Ohio
 Jackson Township, Brown County, Ohio
 Jackson Township, Champaign County, Ohio
 Jackson Township, Clermont County, Ohio
 Jackson Township, Coshocton County, Ohio
 Jackson Township, Crawford County, Ohio
 Jackson Township, Darke County, Ohio
 Jackson Township, Franklin County, Ohio
 Jackson Township, Guernsey County, Ohio
 Jackson Township, Hancock County, Ohio
 Jackson Township, Hardin County, Ohio
 Jackson Township, Highland County, Ohio
 Jackson Township, Jackson County, Ohio
 Jackson Township, Knox County, Ohio
 Jackson Township, Mahoning County, Ohio
 Jackson Township, Monroe County, Ohio
 Jackson Township, Montgomery County, Ohio
 Jackson Township, Muskingum County, Ohio
 Jackson Township, Noble County, Ohio
 Jackson Township, Paulding County, Ohio
 Jackson Township, Perry County, Ohio
 Jackson Township, Pickaway County, Ohio
 Jackson Township, Pike County, Ohio
 Jackson Township, Preble County, Ohio
 Jackson Township, Putnam County, Ohio
 Jackson Township, Richland County, Ohio
 Jackson Township, Sandusky County, Ohio
 Jackson Township, Seneca County, Ohio
 Jackson Township, Shelby County, Ohio
 Jackson Township, Stark County, Ohio
 Jackson Township, Union County, Ohio
 Jackson Township, Van Wert County, Ohio
 Jackson Township, Vinton County, Ohio
 Jackson Township, Wood County, Ohio
 Jackson Township, Wyandot County, Ohio

Pennsylvania 
 Jackson Township, Butler County, Pennsylvania
 Jackson Township, Cambria County, Pennsylvania
 Jackson Township, Columbia County, Pennsylvania
 Jackson Township, Dauphin County, Pennsylvania
 Jackson Township, Greene County, Pennsylvania
 Jackson Township, Huntingdon County, Pennsylvania
 Jackson Township, Lebanon County, Pennsylvania
 Jackson Township, Luzerne County, Pennsylvania
 Jackson Township, Lycoming County, Pennsylvania
 Jackson Township, Mercer County, Pennsylvania
 Jackson Township, Monroe County, Pennsylvania
 Jackson Township, Northumberland County, Pennsylvania
 Jackson Township, Perry County, Pennsylvania
 Jackson Township, Snyder County, Pennsylvania
 Jackson Township, Susquehanna County, Pennsylvania
 Jackson Township, Tioga County, Pennsylvania
 Jackson Township, Venango County, Pennsylvania
 Jackson Township, York County, Pennsylvania

South Dakota 
 Jackson Township, Charles Mix County, South Dakota, in Charles Mix County, South Dakota
 Jackson Township, Sanborn County, South Dakota, in Sanborn County, South Dakota

Township name disambiguation pages